The 2019 BetVictor Masters was the seventh staging of the non-ranking Masters darts tournament, held by the Professional Darts Corporation (PDC). It was held from 1–3 February 2019 at the Marshall Arena in Milton Keynes, England.

Michael van Gerwen was the four-time defending champion, after defeating Raymond van Barneveld 11–9 in the 2018 final.

He successfully defended his title, beating James Wade 11–5 in the final and therefore winning the event for the fifth consecutive time and extending his unbeaten run to 20 matches in the Masters.

Qualifiers
The Masters only features the top 16 players in the PDC Order of Merit after the 2019 PDC World Darts Championship:. Darren Webster, Joe Cullen, and Jonny Clayton made their debuts in the event, while Adrian Lewis returned after a one-year absence. World number four Gary Anderson withdrew with a back injury and was replaced in the draw by seventeenth-ranked Stephen Bunting, who therefore qualified for the first time since 2016.

The following 16 players took part in the tournament:

 Michael van Gerwen (champion)
 Rob Cross (first round)
 Peter Wright  (semi-finals)
 Gary Anderson (withdrew)
 Daryl Gurney (first round)
 Michael Smith (quarter-finals)
 Gerwyn Price (first round)
 Mensur Suljović (quarter-finals)
 Simon Whitlock (first round)
 James Wade (runner-up)
 Ian White (first round)
 Dave Chisnall (semi-finals)
 Darren Webster (first round)
 Adrian Lewis (first round)
 Joe Cullen (quarter-finals)
 Jonny Clayton (first round)
 Stephen Bunting (quarter-finals)

Prize money
The prize money was £200,000 in total, which was the same as in 2018.

Draw

References

External links

Masters
Masters (darts)
Masters (darts)
Masters (darts)
Sport in Milton Keynes
2010s in Buckinghamshire